Belotić may refer to the following villages in Serbia:
 Belotić (Bogatić), Mačva District
 Belotić (Osečina), Kolubara District
 Belotić (Vladimirci), Mačva District